was a Japanese singer-songwriter who specialized in the shamisen.

Biography
Momoyama began learning to play the shamisen at the age of six.

Two years later, in 1963, Momoyama was introduced to the  style of jōruri and came to be one of the few students of its then-final master Miyazono Senju IV. In 1974, she retired as iemoto of the Momoyama school and became the last disciple of Soeda Tomomichi, an authority on the enka of the Meiji and Taishō eras.

In 1981, Momoyama began a project attempting to resurrect the Ryōjin Hishō, a collection of songs from the Heian period. This came to occupy the greater part of the remainder of her life. While touring in Europe, she met the percussionist Tsuchitori Toshiyuki. The two would go on to found the record label  in 1987. Later, the two collaborated with other artists, including Ōno Kazuo.

She died of breast cancer at a hospital on December 5, 2008, in Nisshin, Aichi. She was 69 years old. After her death, Tsuchitori continued to publicize her music.

References 

1939 births
2008 deaths
Japanese singer-songwriters
Musicians from Tokyo
People from Tokyo
Deaths from cancer in Japan